The von Braun Interceptor was a VTO rocket-powered interceptor designed by Wernher von Braun. This aircraft would have used the technology Von Braun had developed for the V-2 rocket during World War II.  Von Braun put forward the proposal to Reichsluftfahrtministerium, on July 6, 1939, but project was ultimately not built.

Background
In 1936, von Braun worked to convert some propeller aircraft to be powered by more powerful rocket engines.  In 1937, the He 112 V3 and He 112 V5 were fitted with rocket engines, but the V3 was destroyed when it suffered an engine explosion during a test.  The He 112 V5, piloted by test pilot Erich Warsitz, was flown to 800 meters (2,625 feet), where Warsitz fired the rocket motor.  The He 112 V5 was the first aircraft to be powered by a liquid-fueled rocket engine, paving the way for more rocket-powered planes built by Germany during World War II.

Design

The von Braun Interceptor featured a conventional design with straight, tapered wings.  Two fuel tanks, one with alcohol and the other with liquid-oxygen, where located behind the pilot, while the rocket engine was located in the tail.  The aircraft was to have an armored, pressurized cockpit for high-altitude flight.  The von Braun Interceptor would take off vertically like the V-2 rocket.  The plane would be stored, fueled and readied for takeoff in a hangar with its nose pointed to the sky, and thus would not need an airfield.  The aircraft would slide out on two rails to take off or to be loaded onto a launch vehicle.  As the aircraft climbed to altitude, the vanes in the rocket exhaust would be used for control.  As the aircraft moved from vertical to horizontal flight the pilot would move to conventional controls and an auxiliary combustion chamber.  After the attack, the aircraft would glide back to the base.  The 1936 design was very much ahead of its time, as the V-2 rocket would not make its first flight until 1944.  This is one of the reasons that the project was not adopted in 1936.  A second design for the von Braun Interceptor had wings with rounded ends and used Visol and SV-Stoff for fuel.  With the new fuel, the von Braun Interceptor would be launched from a truck and was intended to be easier to fuel.  The von Braun Interceptor was to be armed with four guns; two per wing.

The von Braun Interceptor plans were given to the Fieseler Company, which developed it into the Fi 166 in 1941.  The von Braun Interceptor also inspired the Bachem Ba 349 Natter.

See also

Emergency Fighter Program

List of German aircraft projects, 1939–45
Messerschmitt Me 163 Komet
Arado E.381 Kleinstjäger
Blohm & Voss P 214
Focke-Wulf Volksjäger 2
Heinkel P.1077 Julia
Junkers EF 127 Walli
Messerschmitt P.1103
Sombold So 344
Zeppelin Fliegende Panzerfaust
Zeppelin Rammer

References

World War II fighter aircraft of Germany
Research and development in Nazi Germany
Abandoned military aircraft projects of Germany
World War II jet aircraft of Germany
Von Braun Interceptor